Sahmyook University (Korean: 삼육대학교, Chinese character: 三育大學校) is a private, Christian, coeducational university located in Metropolitan Seoul, South Korea. Sahmyook University is part of a worldwide network of Seventh-day Adventist institutions of higher education providing an environment for learning that emphasizes individual commitment to Christ, personal integrity, intellectual development, and community service.

The school was founded in 1906 as Euimyung College in Sunahn, Pyeongan-namdo in what would become today's North Korea. It was the first higher education facility started in Korea, And is today the largest university owned by the Seventh-day Adventist Church.

In 2016, the university had 6 colleges, including the College of Theology, Humanities & Social Science and Health Science & Social Welfare in addition to 4 graduate schools.

History

Establishment of a mission college
Sahmyook University was founded in 1906 as a small, Seventh-day Adventist school called "Euimyung College" by American Seventh-day Adventist missionaries, with the objective to improve the education of church workers in Korea.

However, while under the  rule of Japanese imperialism, the missionaries stopped managing the whole school system due to Shinto worship being enforced by the Japanese rulers. Thus, the school remained closed until the end of the Second World War. After Korea gained its independence from Japan in 1945, the school moved from Sunan and joined with the church headquarters Hoegi, Seoul; The move was completed in 1949.

On the June 25, 1950, the Korean War forced the school to close again. After Seoul was won back in November 1951, the school was relocated to its current location at Gongdeok, Yangjoo, Gyeonggi (later renamed Seoul) and reopened. The school was also renamed Sahmyook College, and the minister James Lee was inaugurated as the first president.

Applications
Each January, over 10,000 students apply at Sahmyook University. Only about 10 percent, or 1,242, of them (mostly non-Adventists) are accepted as new students. Non-Adventists have a higher ratio of successful applications compared with Adventist students. The number of Adventist students annually accepted is around 200, or about 1 in 6.

Institutes and Research Centres
The university has the following research institutes:
Geoscience Research Institute
Korean Institute for HIV/AIDS Prevention
Life Science Research Institute
Mission and Society Research Institute
The Korean Institute of Alcohol Problems
Theological Research Institute
Uimyung Research Institute for Neuroscience

Study abroad opportunities

Sahmyook University co-sponsors Adventist Colleges Abroad, a program in which qualified students study overseas while completing requirements for graduation at Sahmyook University. Undergraduate students may also study abroad. Affiliation and Extension Programs are offered in Puerto Rico, South Africa, Mexico, England, Jamaica, Canada, Romania, India, Russia, Thailand, Italy, Ukraine, Bolivia and the United States. (For the full list of sister universities, go to ▶)

Notable people

Notable alumni
 Lee Han, tenor and professor at Sangji University
 Lee Dong-hoon, men's figure skater
 Jin Goo, actor
 Lee Seung-ryul, soccer player

Notable faculty members
 Kim, Il Mok, current president of Sahmyook University
 Ko, Wonbae, current professor of Chemistry at Sahmyook University
 SEO, Kwangsoo, former president of Sahmyook University
 Han, Sangkyung, manager of "The Garden of Morning Calm" (아침고요수목원); current professor of Horticulture.
 Lee, Gangseong, secretary of the president, the Division of Employment-Industrial Relations at the Blue House
 Yim, Dongsul, current professor of Pharmacy of Sahmyook University
 Kim, Kyungje, current professor at Pharmacy of Sahmyook University
 Cheong, Jayhoon, current professor at Pharmacy of Sahmyook University

See also

 List of Seventh-day Adventist colleges and universities
 Seventh-day Adventist education
Sahmyook Foods
Sahmyook Language School
Sahmyook Medical Center
List of universities in Seoul
List of colleges and universities in South Korea
Education in South Korea

References

External links
 Sahmyook University website

Universities and colleges affiliated with the Seventh-day Adventist Church
Educational institutions established in 1906
Universities and colleges in Seoul
1906 establishments in Korea
Nowon District